Henry Murgatroyd (19 September 1853 – 15 March 1905) was an English first-class cricketer who was a right-handed batsman and a fast bowler. Murgatroyd represented Hampshire in one first-class match in 1883 against Sussex.

External links
Henry Murgatroyd at Cricinfo
Henry Murgatroyd at CricketArchive

1853 births
1905 deaths
Sportspeople from Swindon
People from Wiltshire
English cricketers
Hampshire cricketers